Randall Byron Clark  (born July 27, 1957 in Chicago) is a former tackle who played eight seasons in the National Football League for the St. Louis Cardinals and the Atlanta Falcons.

Clark's early career centered on the Chicago region. He played for Prospect High School in the suburb of Mt. Prospect, then for Northern Illinois before being drafted by the Chicago Bears.

References 

1957 births
Living people
American football offensive linemen
Northern Illinois Huskies football players
St. Louis Cardinals (football) players
Atlanta Falcons players
Players of American football from Chicago
National Football League replacement players